Karl Albert von Schott  (13 May 1840 in Bad Wimpfen – 21 February 1911 in Stuttgart) was a 19th-century Württembergian officer and painter.

Karl Albert von Schott served in rank of lieutenant colonel in the Württemberg army.

After the end of his military service he was in Munich since 1888 a private student of Anton Braith. He was not entered in the register book of the Munich Art Academy.

As a painter he remained loyal to his original profession and painted mostly densely populated battlefield images. He is known primarily for his dramatic paintings of the Franco-Prussian War.

References

 Karl von Schott: Der Anteil der Württemberger am Feldzug 1870/71.
 Bibliographie der Württembergischen Geschichte. Bearb. von Wilhelm Heyd [u. a.] Bd 1-11. Stuttgart 1895-1974.
 Gert K. Nagel: Schwäbisches Künstlerlexikon.

19th-century German painters
19th-century German male artists
German male painters
20th-century German painters
20th-century German male artists
1840 births
1911 deaths